Mary Isabel Lambie  (26 October 1889 – 22 January 1971) was a New Zealand nurse and nursing educator. After World War II she became an international advocate for nursing and nursing education, eventually working with the World Health Organization.

Career 
Born in Christchurch in 1889, Lambie hoped to do medical training but family circumstances prevented her from going to university, and she trained to be a nurse from 1910 to 1913 in Christchurch. In the early part of her career she was a nurse with the school medical service, focusing on education on the prevention of disease and illness. She also collected data on enlarged thyroids and this data led to the discovery of iodine deficiency as a cause of goitre.

She trained as a Plunket nurse in 1924 and completed a course in public health at the University of Toronto in 1925–26. In 1928 she became one of two instructors for a postgraduate nursing programme in hospital administration and teaching or public health nursing. She was dedicated to improving the quality of nursing education and continued her work in the education of health professionals after the war. In 1927 she was appointed as a public health nurse in the Department of Health, becoming director of the division of nursing from 1931 until her retirement in 1950. Her work included inspecting hospitals and schools of nursing, laying the foundations of a public health nursing service as well as being concerned for the health of Māori people.

As well as supporting the work of the Maori Women's Health Leagues she held a number of international positions: in 1946 she was elected president of the Florence Nightingale International Foundation; in 1947 elected first vice-president of the International Council of Nurses; was a member of the South Pacific Board of Health from 1946 to 1949; and in 1950 she became chairperson of the Expert Nursing Advisory Committee of the World Health Organization.

In 1956 she published her autobiography My story: memoirs of a New Zealand nurse.

Public recognition 
In 1935, she was awarded the King George V Silver Jubilee Medal. She was appointed an Officer of the Order of St John in 1937 and an Officer of the Order of the British Empire in the 1938 New Year Honours. In the 1950 New Year Honours, she was promoted to Commander of the Order of the British Empire.

References

Further reading 
Campbell, H. and New Zealand Nursing Education and Research Foundation (1976) Mary Lambie : a biography. Wellington N.Z.: New Zealand Nursing Education and Research Foundation (Studies in nursing, no. 1).
Lambie, M. I. and New Zealand. Department of Health (1951) Historical development of nursing in New Zealand, 1840-1950. Wellington, N.Z.: Dept. of Health.
Lambie, M. I. (1955) New Zealand Registered Nurses' Assn., Wellington Branch : golden jubilee, 1905-1955, souvenir booklet. Wellington, N.Z.: New Zealand Registered Nurses' Assn., Wellington Branch.

1889 births
1971 deaths
New Zealand nurses
New Zealand public servants
People from Christchurch
Officers of the Order of St John
New Zealand Commanders of the Order of the British Empire
New Zealand women nurses